Adam Benjamin is an American jazz keyboardist and composer. He is a founding member of Kneebody, and leads an active career as a performer and writer. He has been recognized as a Rising Star in Jazz by Downbeat Magazine.

Background
Benjamin attended the Eastman School of Music and California Institute for the Arts, where he received a bachelor's and master's degree in jazz studies. Since then, he has performed at numerous festivals and clinics with groups such as Kneebody, Dave Douglas's Keystone, So Percussion, Beck, and Joshua Redman. He has served as adjunct faculty at California Institute of the Arts, University of Southern California, the School for Improvisational Music, and the Banff Jazz Workshop. He is currently an Associate Professor of jazz piano at the University of Nevada, Reno, where he resides.

Discography

As leader
 2007: It's A Standard, Standard, Standard, Standard World
 2008: Long Gone
 2010: Alphabets & Consequences
With Kneebody
 Wendel (2002)
 Kneebody (2005)
 Low Electrical Worker (2007)
 Kneebody Live: Volume One (2007)
 Twelve Songs By Charles Ives (2009) 
 Kneebody Live: Volume Two:  Live in Italy (2009)
 You Can Have Your Moment (2010)
 Kneebody Live: Volume Three:  Live in Paris (2011)
 The Line (2013)
 Kneedelus (2015) 
 Anti-Hero (2017)
 By Fire (2019)
 Chapters (2019)

As sideman
With Dave Douglas & Keystone
 Live in Sweden (Greenleaf, 2005)
 Moonshine (Greenleaf, 2007)
 Live at Jazz Standard (2008)
 Spark of Being: Expand (2010)
With Donny McCaslin
 Perpetual Motion (2010)
With Jimmy Chamberlin
 Life Begins Again (2005)
With Darek Oleskiewicz
 Like A Dream'' (2004)

References

External links
Official website
Blog posts by Adam Benjamin on the Greenleaf Music blog
Jazz Times Review of Alphabets and Consequences

American jazz keyboardists
Year of birth missing (living people)
Place of birth missing (living people)
California Institute of the Arts alumni
Eastman School of Music alumni
Musicians from Los Angeles
Living people
Jazz musicians from California
21st-century American keyboardists
Kneebody members